The Christmas Gift is a 1986 American made-for-television drama film starring John Denver. It was produced by Norman Rosemont, and was Denver's first acting role since Oh, God! (1977). 

Denver said he took the role "because it was the perfect opportunity to ease back into acting; it is a light, warm tale of human relationships. I waited for something that I felt really good about and turned down a lot of scripts over the years. I've been very picky about acting projects and, in retrospect, I made a big mistake a few years ago when I turned down the Zack Mayo role (played by Richard Gere) in An Officer and a Gentleman. It was mostly due to my naivete - I couldn't envision the final product from the initial script."

Plot 
According to both IMDB and Amazon the authorized plot is as follows, "A widowed New York City architect and his young daughter take a Christmas vacation and end up in a small mystical town in Colorado where everyone believes in Santa Claus."</ref>

Home release 
According to Amazon the DVD release of The Christmas Gift was November 4, 2014 with English subtitles through Paramount. Also according to Amazon the runtime for the movie on DVD is 1 hour and 34 minutes.

The Christmas Gift was released on VHS by Good Times Home Video with a runtime as listed only being 96 minutes.

Cast
John Denver - George Billings
Jane Kaczmarek - Susan MacMillen
Gennie James - Alexandra "Alex" Billings 
Edward Winter - Thomas A. Renfield
Pat Corley - Bud Sawyer
Mary Wickes - Henrietta "Aunt Henny" Sawyer
Kurtwood Smith - Jake Richards
James T. Callahan - Robert "Bob" Truesdale
Anne Haney - Clara Huckle
Harvey Vernon - Hank Huckle

See also
 List of Christmas films

References

External links

1986 television films
1986 films
1980s Christmas drama films
American Christmas drama films
Christmas television films
CBS network films
Films directed by Michael Pressman
1980s American films